Florence Tan (born 30 June 1977) is a Malaysian actress based in Singapore. She was prominently a full-time Mediacorp artiste from 1997 to 2006 and managed by Lafeng Entertainment but continues to film on an ad-hoc basis. She left Mediacorp in 2006 to expand her career in China and Asia.

Career
Tan joined the TCS (predecessor of MediaCorp) after winning the gender category in the Star Search 1997. She made her debut in Immortal Love, opposite veterans such as Chew Chor Meng, Pan Lingling and Xiang Yun. In 1998, she was cast in the popular "wuxia" drama series The Return of the Condor Heroes (Singaporean TV series) and went on to act in several period dramas such as "The Legendary Swordsman" and The Heaven Sword and Dragon Saber (2003 TV series). Her last drama with Mediacorp was Zero to Hero 2005.

In 2006, after getting married, Tan subsequently left the industry. She relaunched her career in China after signing with Lafeng Entertainment in 2011 and earned high praise for her role as a scheming concubine in Mystery in the Palace (深宫諜影).

She returned to Singapore and made a cameo appearance in the 2012 anniversary drama Joys of Life as the dead wife of Zhao Dagou, played by former co-star Chew Chor Meng in a flashback.

She is currently actively filming movies and dramas in China and Asia. In 2019, she co-starred in a WeMovie with semi-finalists of the Star Search 2019.

Personal life
Tan married a Taiwanese businessman Jack Liu in 2006. She has twin daughters, Novia and Viola Liu (born 2008).

Filmography

Host in Variety Show

Movie

Music/CD in Singapore

Music/CD in Taiwan

Advertisement/ Commercial:

Accolades

References

External links

Living people
1977 births
Malaysian actresses
Malaysian people of Chinese descent
Singaporean television actresses